Lavrovo is a rural locality (a village) in Myaksinskoye Rural Settlement, Cherepovetsky District, Vologda Oblast, Russia. The population was 16 as of 2002.

Geography 
Mikhalevo is the nearest locality. Ur nearest lake, animal in fino-ugorian, Lake of damn

References 

Rural localities in Cherepovetsky District